Jarkko Komula (born 13 March 1976) is a Finnish former professional darts player who played in Professional Darts Corporation (PDC) events. He is nicknamed Smiley because he rarely smiles.

Darts career

BDO
Komula reached the final of the 2001 Winmau World Masters, beating Andy Fordham 4–0 in the semi-finals. He was beaten in the final by Raymond van Barneveld. He made his BDO World Championship debut in 2002, losing to Ted Hankey in the first round. He suffered a second first round exit at the Lakeside in 2003, losing to Vincent van der Voort. In the 2004 BDO World Darts Championship, he finally won a match, beating Paul Hanvidge but lost in the second round to Mervyn King. In 2005, he lost in the first round again, this time to Robert Wagner.

On 31 May 2008 Komula won the Nordic Cup, beating Sweden's Markus Korhonen in the final.

PDC
At the beginning of 2009, Komula joined the PDC. He qualified for the 2010 PDC World Darts Championship by winning the Finland qualifying event. He defeated Russia's Roman Konchikov by 4 legs to 3 in the preliminary round, but lost to Wes Newton by 3 sets to 0 in the first round. 

Komula had occasional television appearances for the next few years before coming back to prominence by reaching the semi-finals of the PDC World Cup of Darts in 2013 PDC World Cup of Darts along with his Finnish compatriot Jani Haavisto. Their biggest scalp was the Dutch team of Raymond van Barneveld and Michael van Gerwen, and they also beat the home German team of Andree Welge and Jyhan Artut before being defeated by the Belgian team of Kim Huybrechts and Ronny Huybrechts.

Komula once again qualified for the World Championship in 2014, this time directly into the first round, where he defeated seeded player Mark Walsh 3–1, before losing 4–0 to Simon Whitlock.

Jarkko did not renew his Tour Card for 2015, bringing an end to his PDC run.

World Championship results

BDO

2002: 1st round (lost to Ted Hankey 2–3)
2003: 1st round (lost to Vincent van der Voort 1–3)
2004: 2nd round (lost to Mervyn King 2–3)
2005: 1st round (lost to Robert Wagner 2–3)

PDC

2010: 1st round (lost to Wes Newton 0–3)
2013: Last 72 (lost to Jani Haavisto 2–4 legs)
2014: 2nd round (lost to Simon Whitlock 0–4)

Performance timeline

References

External links
Jarkko Komula's Stats at Darts Database

1976 births
Finnish darts players
Living people
British Darts Organisation players
Professional Darts Corporation former tour card holders
Sportspeople from Oulu
PDC World Cup of Darts Finnish team